Alvord Lake is a seasonal shallow alkali lake in Harney County of the U.S. state of Oregon. Its water level varies from dry to several feet deep. The nearest habitation is tiny Fields,  SSW.

At one time, Alvord Lake stretched  along the east side of Steens Mountain.

The Alvord Basin covers about  bounded on the northwest by Steens Mountain, on the southwest by the Pueblo Mountains, on the southeast by the Trout Creek Mountains, and on the northeast by the Sheepshead Mountains.
Major tributaries are Mosquito Creek, Willow Creek, Wildhorse Creek, Whitehorse Creek, Trout Creek, and Van Horn Creek.

The tributaries of Alvord Lake were home to the endemic Alvord cutthroat trout, which is now considered extinct through hybridization with non-native rainbow trout.

See also
 List of lakes in Oregon

References 

Lakes of Oregon
Lakes of Harney County, Oregon
Endorheic lakes of Oregon